Kang Yi-seok (born November 11, 1998) is a South Korean actor. Kang began his career as a child actor, and has starred in television series such as Mr. Goodbye (2006), First Wives' Club (2007), Five Fingers (2012) and Ugly Alert (2013).

Personal life 
He joined the Navy on May 28, 2018 for his mandatory military enlistment and was discharged on March 8, 2020.

Filmography

Film

Television series

Web series

Television show

References

External links 
 
 
 
 

1998 births
Living people
South Korean male child actors
South Korean male television actors
South Korean male film actors
Place of birth missing (living people)
School of Performing Arts Seoul alumni
Republic of Korea Navy personnel